Dmitri Georgiyevich Chikhradze (born 25 December 1922 in Gomi; died 5 May 1979 in Nalchik) was a Soviet Georgian football player and coach.

External links
 

1922 births
People from Racha-Lechkhumi and Kvemo Svaneti
1979 deaths
Soviet footballers
PFC Spartak Nalchik players
Soviet football managers
PFC Spartak Nalchik managers
FC Dynamo Stavropol managers
FC Spartak Vladikavkaz managers
FC Elista managers
Association football forwards